Smooth vector may refer to:

 Smooth vector for a strongly continuous group action; see group action
 Smooth vector field on a differentiable manifold; see tangent space
 A smooth vector in a representation is a vector such that the action at the vector is a smooth function.